Kofi Sarpong Frimpong was a Ghanaian public servant and diplomat. He was the director general of the Ghana Broadcasting Corporation from 1995 to 1999, and Ghana's High Commissioner to Namibia from 2000 to 2001. He died on 5 January 2005.

Career
Frimpong was the host of the programme, Periscope from 1970 to 1978. He was also the quiz master for the quiz show, What do you know (which was then on radio) from 1972 to 1983. As a Political Scientist, he served as a senior lecturer at the University of Maiduguri's Political Science department. He also worked at the Social Security and National Insurance Trust in Accra as the Chief Manager responsible for Public Affairs. In 1987, he was the Director for the Structural Adjustment Programme Secretariat. He served in this capacity until 1991. A year later, he was appointed Special Assistant to the Ghana Secretary for Finance and Economic Planning on Global Coalition for Africa. He worked at the American Embassy in Accra as a Political Specialist from 1993 until his appointment as the Director  General of the Ghana Broadcasting Corporation in 1995. He served in position from 1995 to 1999. Frimpong was 56 years old at the time of his appointment in 1995. 

In 2000 Frimpong was appointed Ghana's High Commissioner to Namibia. He served in this post for about one year. He died on 5 January 2005.

References 

Academic staff of the University of Maiduguri
Ghanaian diplomats
2005 deaths
Year of birth missing